Richard Rowley (also known as Rick Rowley) is a documentary filmmaker. His films and TV shows have received three Emmy awards, an Oscar nomination, and other awards and nominations, as well as recognition at film festivals around the world.

Rowley's Oscar-nominated feature Dirty Wars was the culmination of ten years as a war reporter in Iraq, Afghanistan, and the lesser-known battlegrounds of America's war on terror. Since then, Rowley has turned his lens on racial injustice in the United States. His 2019 feature for Showtime, 16 Shots, won Television Academy honors and a Peabody nomination for its unflinching look at the police murder of Laquan McDonald and the cover-up that followed. His Emmy-winning series Documenting Hate unmasked an underground Nazi fight club and a terrorist cell. The series received a DuPont Award and prompted an FBI investigation that led to dozens of arrests. His latest film, Kingdom Of Silence, is the story of the life and death of Saudi journalist Jamal Khashoggi.

Selected filmography
Rick Rowley directed or co-directed these documentary films:
 Zapatista (1999) – about the Zapatista uprising in Chiapas, Mexico
 This Is What Democracy Looks Like (2000) – about the 1999 World Trade Organization protests in Seattle
 Black and Gold (2001) – about the Latin Kings in New York City
 The Fourth World War (2003) – about resistance movements around the world
 Dirty Wars (2013) – about the war on terror and the Joint Special Operations Command
 The Blue Wall (2018) – about the murder of Laquan McDonald and subsequent events
 16 Shots (2019) – an updated and expanded version of The Blue Wall
 Kingdom of Silence (2020) – about the killing of Jamal Khashoggi
 American Insurrection (2021) – about the 2021 United States Capitol attack (Nominated for a 2021 Peabody Award).

External links

References

Living people
American film directors
Year of birth missing (living people)